Gareth Hywel Jones, QC, FBA (10 November 1930 – 2 April 2016) was a British academic and longtime fellow of Trinity College, Cambridge, and Professor of Law at the University of Cambridge.

Biography
Jones was born in 1930 in Tylorstown, in the Rhondda.  He was educated at the Rhondda County School for Boys, University College London, St Catharine's College, Cambridge and Harvard College.  He became a teaching fellow of Trinity College, Cambridge in 1961, becoming Senior Tutor in 1972, and was appointed Downing Professor of the Laws of England in 1974. Jones was Vice-Master of Trinity from 1986 to 1992, and from 1996 to 1999. He is a fellow of the British Academy. He became a foreign member of the Royal Netherlands Academy of Arts and Sciences in 1991.

Jones was the co-author of Goff & Jones, The Law of Restitution and, with Robert Goff, the acknowledged father of English restitution law.

References

Publications
Goff & Jones, The Law of Restitution, Author Professor Gareth Jones (7th Ed, Sweet & Maxwell, 2009)

People from Tylorstown
1930 births
2016 deaths
British legal scholars
British people of Welsh descent
Fellows of Trinity College, Cambridge
Fellows of the British Academy
Alumni of St Catharine's College, Cambridge
Harvard College alumni
Alumni of University College London
Members of the Royal Netherlands Academy of Arts and Sciences
Downing Professors of the Laws of England